Streatham railway station is a station in central Streatham in south London. Its main entrance now is on Streatham High Road, and is in Travelcard Zone 3.

Services are provided by Southern and Thameslink. Thameslink services go north to St Albans via London Blackfriars and St Pancras, and south to Wimbledon and Sutton. Southern services run between London Bridge and West Croydon.

A news kiosk in the street level ticket hall sells newspapers, coffee and snacks. There is no seating at this level. The platforms are below the station building and accessed by staircases.  There has been no step-free disabled access to the northbound platform since the station forecourt on the up (northbound) platform side was redeveloped in the 1980s for the construction of a supermarket. There is step-free disabled access to the southbound platform via a footpath from Hopton Road (but not via the ticket hall).
Ticket barriers were installed to the entrance in June 2009. New lifts are being constructed for both platforms and are due to be completed by Autumn 2023.

Services
Services at Streatham are operated by Southern and Thameslink using  and  EMUs.

The typical off-peak service in trains per hour is:
 4 tph to  via 
 2 tph to  via 
 2 tph to  via 

Connections
London Buses routes 50, 60, 109, 118, 133, 159, 249, 250, 255, G1, P13 and night routes N109, N133 and N250 serve the station.

Gallery

See also 

The other stations in Streatham are:
Streatham Hill railway station
Streatham Common railway station

References

External links

Railway stations in the London Borough of Lambeth
Former London, Brighton and South Coast Railway stations
Railway stations in Great Britain opened in 1868
Railway stations served by Govia Thameslink Railway
Railway station